The thirteenth series of the children's television series Hi-5 aired between 17 October 2011 and 16 December 2011 on the Nine Network in Australia. The series was produced by Southern Star and Nine with Noel Price as executive producer. 

This was the last series to feature Casey Burgess, Fely Irvine and Tim Maddren. Lauren Brant and Stevie Nicholson continued as cast members in the spin-off series Hi-5 House.

Production

Following the Nine Network and Southern Star's acquisition of the Hi-5 franchise in 2008, a deal was made to produce five new series of the program featuring the "new generation" cast. Southern Star produced two of these series in 2009 and 2010, and begun production of the third in 2011. Noel Price returned as the executive producer for his third series, and all five cast members; Lauren Brant, Casey Burgess, Fely Irvine, Tim Maddren and Stevie Nicholson, returned. 

The thirteenth series premiered on 17 October 2011. The new set of episodes celebrated the program's musical history by reintroducing previous songs of the week to a new generation of fans. The classic songs were reinterpreted for the series, with new costumes and dance routines. Network directors Martin Hersov and Cathy Payne stated, "We know these will continue as hits with our new generation of fans.” 

Irvine departed the cast in late 2011, soon after the series aired, with a network representative stating she was leaving to explore "other career options". This was the final series produced by the Nine Network and Southern Star, before Nine sold the Hi-5 franchise in 2012. The two remaining series originally ordered by Nine in 2009 were not produced.

Cast

Presenters
 Lauren Brant – Body Move
 Casey Burgess – Word Play
 Fely Irvine – Puzzles and Patterns
 Tim Maddren – Making Music
 Stevie Nicholson – Shapes in Space

Episodes

Home video releases

Compilation releases

Full episode releases

Notes

References

External links
 Hi-5 Website

2011 Australian television seasons